S3K may refer to:
Sonic 3 & Knuckles, a Mega Drive video game that can be played when Sonic 3 cartridge connected to Sonic & Knuckles
SimCity 3000
 S3K, a diode electrical component